Krivoi Rog is a former Ukrainian Air Force airbase located near Kryvyi Rih, Dnipropetrovsk Oblast, Ukraine.

The base was home to the 16th Military-Transport Aviation Regiment of the Soviet Air Forces between 1964 and 1979 with the Antonov An-12. along with the 363rd Military-Transport Aviation Regiment between 1946 and 1992 with the Ilyushin Il-76MD.

References

Ukrainian airbases